Castel di Casio (Medial Mountain Bolognese:  or ) is a comune (municipality) of the Metropolitan City of Bologna in the Italian region Emilia-Romagna, about  southwest of Bologna.

Castel di Casio borders the following municipalities: Camugnano, Gaggio Montano,   Grizzana Morandi, Alto Reno Terme, Sambuca Pistoiese.

References

External links
 Official website

Cities and towns in Emilia-Romagna